Phoroncidia nasuta, is a species of spider of the genus Phoroncidia. It is found in Japan, Sri Lanka and Taiwan. The spider is known as Hana Naga poke Ne spider (トウキョウカブトヒメグモ) in Japan.

See also 
 List of Theridiidae species

References

Theridiidae
Spiders of Asia
Chelicerates of Japan
Arthropods of Sri Lanka
Spiders of Taiwan
Spiders described in 1873
Taxa named by Octavius Pickard-Cambridge